Stars on Parade is a 1944 American comedy musical film directed by Lew Landers and starring Larry Parks.

Cast
 Larry Parks as Danny Davis
 Lynn Merrick as Dorothy Dean
 Ray Walker as Billy Blake
 Jeff Donnell as Mary Brooks
 Selmer Jackson as J. L. Carson
 Edythe Elliott as Mrs. Dean
 Mary Currier as Nan McNair
 Danny O'Neil (formerly known as Bill Shumate; né William Petree; 1920–2002) as Danny
 Frank Hubert as Frank
 Jean Hubert as The Chords Member
 Nat King Cole as Nat King Cole
 Judy Clark as The Chords Member
 Ben Carter as Ben Carter Choir Member

References

External links
 
 Stars on Parade at BFI
 Stars on Parade at TCMDB

1944 films
American musical films
1944 musical films
American black-and-white films
1940s English-language films
Films directed by Lew Landers
1940s American films